This is a list of notable residents of Costa Mesa, California.

Notable people
 Rony Argueta, soccer player
 Mike Barrowman, Olympic swimmer
 Jay Bentley, bassist with Bad Religion
 Kathryn Card, actress, died in Costa Mesa
 Cris Crotz, actress, former Miss Nevada
 Sharon Day-Monroe, Olympic high jumper
 Lon Milo Duquette, occultist, writer and musician
 James Gammon, actor (part-time resident; died here)
 Jake Gibb, beach volleyball Olympian
 The Growlers, rock band
 Laurie Hernandez, Olympic gymnast 
 Dave Hester, star of A&E TV's Storage Wars and operator of Dave Hester Auctions
 Mitchell Hurwitz, creator of the television sitcom Arrested Development as well as the co-creator of The Ellen Show, and a contributor to The John Larroquette Show and The Golden Girls
 Tom Jancar, contemporary art dealer Jancar Kuhlenschmidt Gallery
 Mitch Lucker, deceased vocalist of deathcore band Suicide Silence (buried here) 
 Bill Madden, singer-songwriter and musician (former resident)
 Misty May-Treanor, three-time Olympic gold-medalist in beach volleyball
 Xeno Müller, Olympic gold and silver medalist in rowing (single sculls)
 Mike Ness, singer and guitarist of the punk band Social Distortion (former resident)
 Of Mice & Men, metalcore band
Tarek El Moussa, star of HGTV's Flip or Flop
 Jaime Pressly, actress, went to CMHS
 Kyla Ross, USA Gymnastics Junior National Team member, 2009 U.S. Junior National Champion, and 2009 Junior Pan American Games Champion; trains at Gym-Max
 Philip Sahagun, martial arts champion, Cirque Du Soleil artist and coach
 Jesse Sapolu, former NFL player
 Fanny Bixby Spencer, philanthropist and antiwar activist
 Jason Thornberry, author (former resident)
 Alex Varkatzas, metalcore band Atreyu's former front man and current half of the project I Am War; also owner of the gym Hellenic Fitness
 Brett Young (singer), country singer, went to Calvary Chapel Costa Mesa

References

Costa Mesa, California
 
Costa Mesa